Greve Municipality is a municipality (Danish, kommune) about 21 km south-west of Copenhagen in Region Sjælland on the east coast of the island of Zealand (Sjælland) in eastern Denmark.  The municipality covers an area of 60 km², and has a total population of 50,818 (2022).

The site of its municipal council is the town of Greve Strand.

It serves primarily as a residential municipality, functioning as a suburb for the larger Copenhagen area.

History
Until the 1960s the area was primarily agricultural, and most businesses in town were concentrated along the coastal road "Strandvejen".  With numerous holiday cottages near the coast of Køge Bugt (Køge Bay), this was also the destination for many inhabitants of Copenhagen on holiday away from the hustle and bustle of the city.

During the late 1960s and into the 1970s, many people moved permanently out of Copenhagen and into new homes in places like Greve.  What was formerly farmers' fields quickly turned into districts of detached houses, whilst most of the shops and similar businesses near the coastal road moved into central shopping malls such as Hundige Storcenter and Greve Midtby Center. Around 1980 the S-train railroad network was expanded towards Køge, and the stations Greve and Hundige were placed adjacent to the shopping malls.

It was established by combining the following parishes:
 Greve
 Hundige
 Karlslunde
 Karlslunde Strand
 Kildebrønde
 Mosede
 Tune.

Greve municipality was one of the municipalities that was not merged 1 January 2007 in the nationwide Kommunalreformen ("The Municipal Reform" of 2007).

Locations

Politics
Greve's municipal council consists of 21 members, elected every four years. The municipal council has six political committees.

National results

Municipal council
Below are the municipal councils elected since the Municipal Reform of 2007.

2005 election results
2005 local election results:

2009 election results
2009 local election results:

2013 election results
2013 local election results:

2017 election results
2017 local election results:

2021 election results
2021 local election results:

References 

 Municipal statistics: NetBorger Kommunefakta, delivered from KMD aka Kommunedata (Municipal Data)
 Municipal mergers and neighbors: Eniro map with named municipalities

External links 

 
 Krak searchable/printable map 

 
Municipalities of Region Zealand
Municipalities of Denmark
Copenhagen metropolitan area